Women's Professional Fastpitch (WPF) is a professional women's fastpitch softball league in the United States. The new league began its promotional campaign in 2021 and launched its inaugural season in June 2022.

The league is unrelated to the defunct league that used the names National Pro Fastpitch (NPF) and Women's Pro Softball League (WPSL) along with Women's Professional Fastpitch.

Teams

See also 
 National Pro Fastpitch
 Men's professional softball in the United States
 Women's sports

References

External links 

Softball competitions
Professional sports leagues in the United States
2022 establishments in the United States